Allāmah (Urdu and , meaning "learned") is an Islamic honorary title for a profound scholar, a polymath, a man of vast reading and erudition, or a great learned one.

The title is carried by scholars of Islamic fiqh (jurisprudence) and philosophy. It is used as an honorific in Sunni Islam as well as in Shia Islam, mostly in South Asia, the Middle East and Iran. Sunnis and Shias who have achieved scholarship in several disciplines are often referred to by the title. It is also used for philosophers, such as Allama Iqbal.

See also
 Abu al-Barakat al-Nasafi
 Shaykh al-Islām
 List of ayatollahs
 List of marjas

References 

Arabic words and phrases
Islamic honorifics
Islamic scholars
Noble titles
Religious leadership roles
Titles